Computer-based interlocking is railway signal interlocking implemented with computers, rather than using older technologies such as relays or mechanics.

General 

CBIs are mostly implemented in two parts; a section that implements the safety and failsafe requirements, and a second section that implements "non-vital" controls and indications.

Brands 

Different manufacturers have their own brands of CBI such as

 SSI (Solid State Interlocking) - BR, Invensys, GEC-General Signal
 Mircrolok II
 Smartlock
 Germany - Alister CBI from Funkwerk IT

Interface between different brands 

When interfacing different brands of CBI equipment, it may be necessary to use relays of each regime, which are then hardwired from one to the other.  This happens in the middle of the Channel Tunnel where French and British signalling equipment meet.

Competition Rules 

Since only some of the major signalling organisations make CBI equipment, it was agreed that to prevent other players being left out in the cold, CBI equipment would be made available to those players at cost.

References 

Interlocking systems
Rail infrastructure